The Butterfly That Flew Over the Sea (Spanish:La mariposa que voló sobre el mar) is a 1948 Spanish film directed by Antonio de Obregón.

Cast
 Francisco Alonso
 Manuel Arbó
  Osvaldo Genazzani
 Guillermina Grin
 Luis Hurtado
 Mari Paz Molinero
 Niní Montiam
 Jacinto San Emeterio
 Vicente Vega

References

Bibliography 
 Nicolás Fernández-Medina & Maria Truglio. Modernism and the Avant-garde Body in Spain and Italy. Routledge, 2016.

External links 
 

1948 films
1940s Spanish-language films
Films directed by Antonio de Obregón
Spanish black-and-white films
1940s Spanish films